The Casino Queen is a riverboat casino located near the Mississippi River in East St. Louis, Illinois, just across the river from downtown St. Louis. It is owned by Gaming and Leisure Properties and operated by an employee-owned management company.

History

Illinois enacted a riverboat casino law in 1990 authorizing licenses for ten casinos to open around the state. One of the licenses was guaranteed to East St. Louis, in an effort to help the financially troubled city. The group that would ultimately open the Casino Queen, led by real estate developer Bill Koman, submitted its proposal to the Illinois Gaming Board in January 1992. With no other proposals before the board, Koman's group was awarded the license in May 1992.

The Casino Queen opened on June 23, 1993. It was viewed positively by most city officials and residents, as the struggling city desperately needed both a revenue source and employment opportunities for its residents. Casino Queen originally operated on a boat called the White Star One.

Construction of a hotel began in 1998. The 157-room hotel, built at a cost of $15 million, opened in January 2000.

Changed regulations led to the casino to be moved inland, but still built above a shallow pit of water, in 2007. The move also allowed the casino to add 10,000 additional square feet of gaming space. In 2014, the White Star One was auctioned off and sold for $600,000. Casino Queen has generated over $160 million for the city of East St. Louis between 1993 and 2009.

In 2012, Koman and his partners sold the Casino Queen for $170 million to a newly formed Employee Stock Ownership Plan (ESOP), which would steer the casino's profits into the retirement accounts of participating employees. In 2014, to pay down debt taken on to finance the purchase, the ESOP sold the real estate of the Casino Queen to Gaming and Leisure Properties for $140 million, leasing it back for $14 million per year.

In 2020, the casino struck a deal with sports betting provider DraftKings to rebrand the property as DraftKings at Casino Queen. As part of the rebranding, the property will undergo a $10 million renovation that will replace the property's current restaurants and buffet with a full sportsbook, a new all-day restaurant, and a food court with three new quick-service options. The casino will also be integrated into DraftKings' mobile betting app, and also reached an agreement with Fairmount Park Racetrack in nearby Collinsville to operate slots and table games on their property, although sports betting competitor FanDuel has the track's sports-betting license.

Property information
The casino includes both 1,100 slots and 34 table games in its 38,000 square feet of gaming space. Per Illinois law and unlike neighboring Missouri casinos, it is not open 24 hours a day.

Dining options include: the Market Street Buffet, Prime Steakhouse, Sevens, and Deli & Chips.

Both a hotel and an RV Park are located on the Casino Queen property.

See also
List of casinos in Illinois

References

External links

East St. Louis, Illinois
Casinos in Illinois
Riverboat casinos